Beaver Township is one of 21 current townships in Carroll County, Arkansas, USA. As of the 2010 census, its total population was 1,787.

Geography

Cities, towns, villages, and CDPs
Beaver
Holiday Island (part)

References

 United States Census Bureau 2008 TIGER/Line Shapefiles
 United States National Atlas
 Census 2010 U.S. Gazetteer Files: County Subdivisions in Arkansas

External links
 US-Counties.com
 City-Data.com

Townships in Carroll County, Arkansas
Townships in Arkansas